Kaltbrunn railway station is a railway station situated in the municipality of Kaltbrunn in the Swiss canton of St. Gallen.

The station is served by hourly St. Gallen S-Bahn service S4, which operates in both directions around a loop via Wattwil, St. Gallen, Sargans, Ziegelbrücke and Uznach.

References 

Railway stations in the canton of St. Gallen
Swiss Federal Railways stations